Slap Happy Cartoons Inc. is a Canadian animation company founded by Kathy Antonsen Rocchio, Vito Viscomi, Greg Sullivan, and Josh Mepham.

Productions

Television 
 The Tom and Jerry Show (2014–2021)
 Nerds and Monsters  (2014-2016)
 Wishfart  (2018–present)
 The Hollow (2018–2020)
 Apple & Onion (2019–2021)
 Tom and Jerry in New York (2021–present)

Feature films 
 Teen Titans Go! To the Movies (2018)
 Tom and Jerry: Cowboy Up! (2022)
 Tom and Jerry: Snowman's Land (2022)

Promos 
 Knowledge Kids (animated promos)

References

External links 
 

Canadian animation studios